John Sparrow may refer to:

John Sparrow (MP) (by 1516–1545/1546), MP for Ipswich
John Sparrow (translator) (1615–1670), English academic, barrister, translator of the works of Jakob Böhme
John Sparrow (academic) (1906–1992), English academic, barrister, book-collector and Warden of All Souls College, Oxford
John Sparrow (footballer), English football left-back
John Sparrow (musician), member of the band Violent Femmes

See also
Jack Sparrow, the main protagonist of the Pirates of the Caribbean film series